Patrick Francis Halley (May 31, 1895 – July 7, 1956) was a merchant and politician in Newfoundland. He represented St. John's West in the Newfoundland House of Assembly from 1932 to 1934 as a United Newfoundland Party member.

The son of William Joseph Halley and Anne Haw, he was born in St. John's, Newfoundland and Labrador and was educated at Saint Bonaventure's College and at University College in Dublin. After completing his education, he went into the family dry goods business. In 1923, he married Alice Byrne. Halley established the Arcade Stores in 1938. He took over the operation of the family business after the death of his father. He was a director of the Newfoundland Theatres and of the Fire and General Insurance Co. Halley also served as president of the local Knights of Columbus.

He died in St. John's at the age of 61.

References 

1895 births
1956 deaths
Dominion of Newfoundland people
United Newfoundland Party MHAs